Cheroh is a small village in the north of Raub District,  Pahang, Malaysia, with a population of about 5,000 people. Agriculture is the main occupation. There is a golf course located 1.5 km before the village from the direction of Raub.

Schools in Cheroh:
SRJK(C) Cheroh
SRJC(T) Cheroh

References

Raub District
Villages in Pahang